(June 11, 1886 – October 1948) was a Japanese illustrator, cartoonist, and writer.

Biography 
Okamoto Ippei was the second son of the Confucian scholar Katei Okamoto. He studied Western-style painting at Tokyo School of the Arts under the instruction of Japanese painter Fujishima Takeji. He started working as a scenery painter for Teikoku Theater in 1910. After getting married, he set up in Kyobashi with his family.

Okamoto traveled to Europe and the United States and brought to Japan several comics. In 1912, he started to draw manga for the newspaper Asahi Shinbun.

During the World War II, he moved to Hamamatsu and Gifu. He opened a school called Ippei Juku, where he was teacher of cartoonists Hidezo Kondo and Yukio Matsuura.

Style 
Okamoto became popular as a manga artist in the Taisho era due to his style that combined manga with refined writing. He included features of film in his comics. Manga artist Osamu Tezuka mentioned Okamoto as one of his main influences.

Personal life 
Okamoto Ippei met Kanoko Okamoto when she sent him a poem that fed his interest. They met in the fall of 1909. In 1910, he married Kanoko Okamoto. He used to train younger drawers and after retiring, he helped his wife in her work as a novelist.

References 

1886 births
1948 deaths
Japanese illustrators
Japanese cartoonists